Askar Simitko, alternative spellings use "Asghar Smitko", or "Asghar Simko" (1953–January 28, 1996) was a Kurdish Iranian Political activist operating in Turkey. He was found tortured and shot dead by unknown agents of Turkey's MIT Organization and Iran's Intelligence and Security in Istanbul.

Background
Asghar Simko was born 1953 in Urmia (West Azarbaijan province) in Iran as a son of Tahir-Khan and grandson of Simko Shikak (the great and historical leader of Kurdistan). 

As of September 1985, he was dwelling in Istanbul, and along with his father he secured communication between members of the Barzani organization.

At the same time, he was threatened by the Iranian Intelligence Organization.

In 1993, he applied for asylum in a third country.

On January 15, 1996, he and his friend Lazım Esmaeili, were abducted by unknown persons from Turkish MIT and Iran's intelligence when they left the casino of Polat Renaissance Hotel in Yeşilköy, İstanbul at local time 03:45 or 03:30. On January 28, 1996, villagers found the corpses of the two in Kerev Creek, Silivri, about  far from İstanbul.

See also
List of unsolved murders

References

External links
  (contains the Susurluk reports in English)

1953 births
1995 deaths
Assassinated Iranian people
Assassinated spies
Deaths by firearm in Turkey
Iranian people murdered abroad
Iranian spies
Male murder victims
People from Urmia
People murdered in Turkey
Susurluk scandal
Unsolved murders in Turkey